Rebecca Spit Marine Provincial Park is a provincial park in British Columbia, Canada, located on the east side of Quadra Island, near the city of Campbell River.

References

Provincial Parks of the Discovery Islands
Provincial parks of British Columbia
1959 establishments in British Columbia
Protected areas established in 1959
Marine parks of Canada